Nefise Karatay (born 26 April 1976) is a Turkish television personality, presenter, actress, former top model and beauty pageant winner. She is known for being an anchor on CNN Türk.

Biography
Nefise Karatay was born and lived the first years of her life in Hesse, Germany, as the daughter of parents from Turkey. She was one of the highest-paid models of Turkey in the late 1990s and early 2000s.

Career
In 1997, Karatay competed in and won the Interstar Miss Turkey beauty pageant. She portrayed Ahu Toros, the main female protagonist in the TV series Valley of the Wolves: Ambush.

Personal life
Karatay married businessman Yusuf Day on 16 July 2012 at Esma Sultan Mansion. In August 2015, she gave birth to her daughter, Maya Day.

Filmography

References

External links
 

1976 births
Living people
People from Hesse
Turkish female models
Turkish film actresses
Turkish television actresses
Turkish television presenters
German female models
German film actresses
German television actresses
German television presenters
German people of Turkish descent
German women television presenters
Turkish women television presenters